Benjamin Charles Spoor  (2 June 1878 – 22 December 1928) was a British Labour Party politician. He took a particular interest in India.

Born in Witton Park, County Durham, he went to Elmfield College, York, and came from a family of Primitive Methodists. An engineer by training, he later went into business as a builder's merchant. Before entering politics, he was a lay preacher in the Methodist Church.

At the 1918 general election, he was elected as Member of Parliament for Bishop Auckland, and held the seat until his death at the age of fifty. In Parliament, he found himself at odds with many Labour MPs and contemplated joining the Liberal Party. He was the Parliamentary Secretary to the Treasury and Chief Whip in 1924, when he was made a Privy Councillor.

He had suffered from poor health since contracting malaria at Salonika during World War I. On a visit to London in December 1928, he was found dead in bed at the Regent Palace Hotel. At the inquest, his son said that his father had taken to drinking heavily. His death, it was decided, was due to syncope from disease of the heart and liver, due to chronic alcoholism.

References
 The Times, 24 December 1928 (obituary), 27 December 1928 (inquest report)
 The Fall of Lloyd George: The Political Crisis of 1922

External links 
 

Spoor, Benjamin
Spoor, Benjamin
Spoor, Benjamin
Spoor, Benjamin
UK MPs 1918–1922
UK MPs 1922–1923
UK MPs 1923–1924
UK MPs 1924–1929
People from County Durham (district)